Mr. Tall is the thirty-first book in the Mr. Men series by Roger Hargreaves.

Story
Mr. Tall is a blue Mr. Man with long legs and red shoes who hates his oversized legs. He meets Mr. Small, and when Mr. Small goes for a swim, Mr. Tall can't, but three other Mr. Men teach him that oversized body parts can be helpful. Mr. Tall then decides that his long legs are great for walking, and while Mr. Tall made it home quickly, Mr. Small took a year to get home. He is now happy.

International publications & translations
Mr. Tall appears under the titles:

Monsieur Grand (French)
Don Alto (Spanish)
Unser Herr Riesig (German)
Ο Κύριος Ψηλός (Greek)
長腿先生 (Taiwan)
키다리씨 (Korean)

The Mr. Men Show
Mr. Tall appeared in the second season of The Mr. Men Show, and he was voiced by Keith Wickham (UK) and Godfrey (US). In the second season, he retains his look but is darker blue and is given a brown hat to match his shoes. His only speaking appearance is in the episode "Travel". He has a voice deeper than Mr. Strong's in the US dub and a Polish accent in the UK dub.

List of characters
This is a list of Mr. Men, Little Miss and other special characters that appear in this book.
 Mr. Small
 Mr. Tickle
 Mr. Nosey
 Mr. Greedy

Title character other appearances
This is a list of other books that the title character has appeared in.
 Mr. Brave
 Mr. Christmas
 Little Miss Helpful
 Little Miss Brainy
 Little Miss Fun
 Little Miss Jealous

See also
Mr. Men
Roger Hargreaves
Adam Hargreaves

External links
Official Mr. Men website

Mr. Men series
Literary characters introduced in 1978